Dual serine/threonine and tyrosine protein kinase is an enzyme that in humans is encoded by the DSTYK gene.

This protein is also known as the Dusty protein kinase and the Receptor interacting protein 5 (RIP5). 

This gene encodes a dual serine/threonine and tyrosine protein kinase which is expressed in multiple tissues. Multiple alternatively spliced transcript variants have been found, but the biological validity of some variants has not been determined.

In melanocytic cells RIPK5 gene expression may be regulated by MITF.

Mutations in this gene have been associated with hereditary spastic paraplegia type 23.

It has also seen that DSTYK deletion causes pigmentation problems and high cell death after ultraviolet irradiation. In a study conducted by Giner-Delgado, Carla, et al. it has been observed that the inversion of the first intron has been associated with changes in expression in the proximal genes and with an increase in the expression of DSTKY itself. Due to the deleterious effect caused by the absence of expression, the positive selection of this investment could explain its increase in the African population. They also noted that the investment has been linked to an increased risk of glaucoma in Europeans (which again shows the possible positive selection, since glaucoma is more common and severe in individuals of African descent.

References

Further reading